Martyn Sprague (born 10 April 1949) is a Welsh former professional footballer. A left-back, he joined Newport County in 1969 from local club Lovells Athletic. He went on to make 156 English Football League appearances for Newport scoring one goal. In 1974, he joined Merthyr Tydfil.

References

External links

People from Risca
Sportspeople from Caerphilly County Borough
Footballers from Newport, Wales
Welsh footballers
Newport County A.F.C. players
Merthyr Tydfil F.C. players
English Football League players
1949 births
Living people
Lovell's Athletic F.C. players
Association football fullbacks